Acaridryas is a genus of mites in the family Diarthrophallidae.

References

Mesostigmata
Articles created by Qbugbot